The 1920 Argentine Primera División was the 29th season of top-flight football in Argentina. The AFA season began on March 21 and ended in January 1921 while the AAmF began on March 28 and also ended on January 1921.

Boca Juniors won its 2nd. consecutive AFA championship while River Plate won the dissident Asociación Amateurs de Football (AAmF) title, putting an ended to the seven consecutive titles won by Racing.

As champion of the AFA season, Boca Juniors qualified to the 1920 Copa Aldao.

Final tables

Asociación Argentina de Football - Copa Campeonato

Club Eureka disappeared when merging with Sportivo Palermo while the Association expanded the number of to 13 clubs participating. Banfield returned to Primera after promoting the last year while Sportivo Barracas came from rival league "Asociación Amateurs de Football". The rest of the teams were promoted to Primera through a resolution by the association, they were Del Plata, Sportivo del Norte (then Colegiales), Nueva Chicago, Lanús, and Sportivo Palermo.

Asociación Amateurs de Football

The tournament started with 17 teams then expanded to 19 when Lanús and Sportivo Almagro (that had previously left the Asociación Argentina) joined the league. Ferro Carril Oeste returned to the league after being relegated 2 years before. Barracas Central debuted in Primera after winning the Primera B (Aam) title last year. Sportivo Buenos Aires also debuted in the top division.

References

Argentine Primera División seasons
1920 in Argentine football
1920 in South American football